Sunil Prabhu is an Indian politician belonging to the Shiv Sena. He is a member of the 14th Maharashtra Legislative Assembly. He represents the Dindoshi Assembly Constituency. He was the 74th mayor of the city of Mumbai, the capital of the Indian state of Maharashtra, and chief of Brihanmumbai Municipal Corporation, the country's richest municipal body.

Early life and career
Prabhu started his career in 1992 as a personal assistant to a senior Shiv Sena leader and MP, Gajanan Kirtikar, until 1997. It was on Kirtikar's insistence that he had gotten a chance to fight the civic elections from Aarey Colony in 1997. Subsequently, he went on to win three civic elections. However, Prabhu has been voted as the best orator in the civic house on several occasions. He is known for his powerful speeches, especially on financial issues.. He was the leader of the house in BMC for six years.

Positions held
 1997: Elected as corporator in Brihanmumbai Municipal Corporation (1st term)
 2002: Re-elected as corporator in Brihanmumbai Municipal Corporation (2nd term)
 2007: Re-elected as corporator in Brihanmumbai Municipal Corporation (3rd term)
 2012: Re-elected as corporator in Brihanmumbai Municipal Corporation (4th term)
 2012-2014: Mayor of Brihanmumbai Municipal Corporation
 2014: Elected to Maharashtra Legislative Assembly
 2019: Re-elected to Maharashtra Legislative Assembly 
 2019-2022: Chief whip,Shivsena

See also
 Mayor of Mumbai

References

External links
 official twitter account
  Shivsena Home Page 
 http://m.newshunt.com/india/marathi-newspapers/saamana/mumbai/kostal-rodala-shivasenapramukhanche-nav-dya-sunil-prabhu-yanche-mukhyamantryanna-patr_41493590/c-in-l-marathi-n-saam-ncat-Mumbai

Living people
Mayors of Mumbai
Marathi politicians
Shiv Sena politicians
Maharashtra MLAs 2014–2019
1969 births